The Nanyao Temple is a Mazu temple in Nanyao Village, Changhua City, Changhua County, Taiwan.It is designated as a third grade historic building.

History
The construction of the temple was completed in 1738 and originally named Mazu Temple. In November 1738, the construction of the main hall was planned and the temple was renamed Nanyao Temple. In December 1872, a face-cleaning room was added on the left side of the temple thus the cylindrical pillars were constructed. It was originally designed as two-tier structure but the third tier was added during the Japanese rule. On 25 April 1985, the Ministry of the Interior designated the temple as a  historical building.

Architecture
The temple consists of ceremonial arch, Sanchuan Gate, main hall, Guanyin Hall, Heavenly Hall and pilgrims' building. The main hall was constructed with traditional architectural style while the Guanyin Hall was constructed with the combination of Fujian, Western and Japanese styles.

See also
 Qianliyan & Shunfeng'er
 List of Mazu temples around the world
 Kaihua Temple
 Shengwang Temple
 Yuanching Temple
 Changhua Confucian Temple
 Bengang Tianhou Temple
 List of temples in Taiwan
 List of tourist attractions in Taiwan

References

1738 establishments in Taiwan
Changhua City
Mazu temples in Changhua
Religious buildings and structures completed in 1738